Ricardo Conde (4 November 1930 – 2 September 1994) was a Spanish swimmer. He competed in the men's 100 metre freestyle and the water polo tournament at the 1952 Summer Olympics.

References

External links
 

1930 births
1994 deaths
Spanish male freestyle swimmers
Spanish male water polo players
Olympic swimmers of Spain
Olympic water polo players of Spain
Swimmers at the 1952 Summer Olympics
Water polo players at the 1952 Summer Olympics
Swimmers from Barcelona
20th-century Spanish people